Four major human polls make up the 2019 NCAA Division I men's soccer rankings: United Soccer Coaches, Top Drawer Soccer, Soccer America, and CollegeSoccerNews.com.

Legend

United Soccer Coaches 

Source:

Top Drawer Soccer 

Source:

Soccer America

College Soccer News

References

College men's soccer rankings in the United States